Somatic hypermutation (or SHM) is a cellular mechanism by which the immune system adapts to the new foreign elements that confront it (e.g. microbes), as seen during class switching. A major component of the process of affinity maturation, SHM diversifies B cell receptors used to recognize foreign elements (antigens) and allows the immune system to adapt its response to new threats during the lifetime of an organism. Somatic hypermutation involves a programmed process of mutation affecting the variable regions of immunoglobulin genes. Unlike germline mutation, SHM affects only an organism's individual immune cells, and the mutations are not transmitted to the organism's offspring. Because this mechanism is merely selective and not precisely targeted, somatic hypermutation has been strongly implicated in the development of B-cell lymphomas and many other cancers.

Targeting

When a B cell recognizes an antigen, it is stimulated to divide (or proliferate). During proliferation, the B-cell receptor locus undergoes an extremely high rate of somatic mutation that is at least 105–106 fold greater than the normal rate of mutation across the genome. Variation is mainly in the form of single-base substitutions, with insertions and deletions being less common. These mutations occur mostly at "hotspots" in the DNA, which are concentrated in hypervariable regions. These regions correspond to the complementarity-determining regions; the sites involved in antigen recognition on the immunoglobulin. The "hotspots" of somatic hypermutation vary depending on the base that is being mutated.  RGYW for a G, WRCY for a C, WA for an A and TW for a T. The overall result of the hypermutation process is achieved by a balance between error-prone and high fidelity repair. This directed hypermutation allows for the selection of B cells that express immunoglobulin receptors possessing an enhanced ability to recognize and bind a specific foreign antigen.

Mechanisms

The mechanism of SHM involves deamination of cytosine to uracil in DNA by the enzyme activation-induced cytidine deaminase, or AID. A cytosine:guanine pair is thus directly mutated to a uracil:guanine mismatch. Uracil residues are not normally found in DNA, therefore, to maintain the integrity of the genome, most of these mutations must be repaired by high-fidelity Base excision repair enzymes. The uracil bases are removed by the repair enzyme, uracil-DNA glycosylase. Error-prone DNA polymerases are then recruited to fill in the gap and create mutations.

The synthesis of this new DNA involves error-prone DNA polymerases, which often introduce mutations at the position of the deaminated cytosine itself or neighboring base pairs. During B cell division the immunoglobulin variable region DNA is transcribed and translated. The introduction of mutations in the rapidly proliferating population of B cells ultimately culminates in the production of thousands of B cells, possessing slightly different receptors and varying specificity for the antigen, from which the B cell with highest affinities for the antigen can be selected. The B cells with the greatest affinity will then be selected to differentiate into plasma cells producing antibody and long-lived memory B cells contributing to enhanced immune responses upon reinfection.

The hypermutation process also utilizes cells that auto-select against the 'signature' of an organism's own cells. It is hypothesized that failures of this auto-selection process may also lead to the development of an auto-immune response.

Models
Developments on the viability of the two main competing molecular models on the mechanism of somatic hypermutation (SHM) since 1987 have now reached a resolution, particular molecular data published since 2000.
Much of this early phase data has been reviewed by Teng and Papavasiliou and additionally outlined by Di Noia and Maul, and the SHM field data reviewed in Steele and additionally outlined in these papers.

DNA deamination model
This can be labelled the DNA-based model. It is enzymatically focused solely on DNA substrates.
The modern form, outlined in previous sections is the Neuberger "DNA deamination model" based on activation-induced cytidine deaminase (AID) and short-patch error-prone DNA repair by DNA polymerase-eta operating around AID C-to-U lesions
This model only partially explains the origins of the full spectrum of somatic mutations at A:T and G:C base pairs observed in SHM in B lymphocytes in vivo during an antigen-driven immune response.
It also does not logically explain how strand biased mutations may be generated.
A key feature is its critical dependence on the gap-filling error prone DNA repair synthesis properties of DNA polymerase-eta targeting A:T base pairs at AID-mediated C-to-U lesions or ssDNA nicks.
This error-prone DNA polymerase is the only known error-prone polymerase involved in SHM in vivo.
What is often ignored in these studies is that this Y family DNA polymerase enzyme is also an efficient reverse transcriptase as demonstrated in in vitro assays.

Reverse transcriptase model

The more controversial competing mechanism is an RNA/RT-based mechanism (reverse transcriptase model of SHM) which attempts to explain the production of the full spectrum of strand-biased mutations at A:T and G:C base pairs whereby mutations of A are observed to exceed mutations of T (A>>>T) and mutations of G are observed to exceed mutations of C (G>>>C). This involves error-prone cDNA synthesis via an RNA-dependent DNA polymerase copying the base modified Ig pre-mRNA template and integrating the now error-filled cDNA copy back into the normal chromosomal site. The errors in the Ig pre-mRNA are a combination of adenosine-to-inosine (A-to-I) RNA editing and RNA polymerase II transcription elongation complex copying uracil and abasic sites (arising as AID-mediated lesions) into the nascent pre-mRNA using the transcribed (TS) DNA as the copying template strand. The modern form of this mechanism thus critically depends on AID C-to-U DNA lesions and long tract error-prone cDNA synthesis of the transcribed strand by DNA polymerase-eta acting as a reverse transcriptase.

The evidence for and against each mechanism is critically evaluated in Steele showing that all the molecular data on SHM published since 1980 supports directly or indirectly this RNA/RT-based mechanism.
Recently Zheng et al. have supplied critical independent validation by showing that Adenosine Deaminase enzymes acting on RNA (ADARs) can A-to-I edit both the RNA and DNA moieties of RNA:DNA hybrids in biochemical assays in vitro. RNA:DNA hybrids of about 11 nucleotides in length are transient structures formed at transcription bubbles in vivo during RNA polymerase II elongation.

A preliminary analysis of the implications of the Zheng et al. data has been submitted as formal paper to a refereed journal by Steele and Lindley. The Zheng et al. data strongly imply that the RNA moiety would need to be first A-to-I RNA edited then reverse transcribed and integrated to generate the strong A>>>T strand biased mutation signatures at A:T base pairs observed in all SHM and cancer hypermutation data sets. Editing (A-to-I) of the DNA moiety at RNA:DNA hybrids in vivo cannot explain the A>>T strand bias because such direct DNA modifications would result in T>>>A strand bias which is not observed in any SHM or cancer data set in vivo.
In this regard Robyn Lindley has also recently discovered that the Ig-SHM-like strand-biased mutations in cancer genome protein-coding genes are also in "codon-context". Lindley has termed this process targeted somatic mutation (TSM) to highlight that somatic mutations are far more targeted than previously thought in somatic tissues associated with disease.
The TSM process implies an "in-frame DNA reader" whereby DNA and RNA deaminases at transcribed regions are guided in their mutagenic action, by the codon reading frame of the DNA.

See also
 Affinity maturation
 Anergy
 Immune system
 V(D)J recombination
 Immunoglobulin class switching

References

External links
 

Immune system
Antibodies